Church of St. Archangel Michael is Orthodox Christian church in Bosnia and Herzegovina. It is located in Veličani village within contemporary Orthodox cemetery, in a central part of Popovo Polje, municipality Trebinje, Republika Srpska entity.

National monument
Church is surrounded with medieval Stećak necropolis, and together they constitute an assemble, which is designated a National monument of Bosnia and Herzegovina, and declared by Commission to preserve national monuments of Bosnia and Herzegovina on 4 March 2003.

References

Churches in Trebinje
Buildings and structures in Republika Srpska
Serbian Orthodox church buildings in Bosnia and Herzegovina
National Monuments of Bosnia and Herzegovina